The list of shipwrecks in 1988 includes ships sunk, foundered, grounded, or otherwise lost during 1988.

January

8 January

12 January

15 January

17 January

18 January

29 January

February

8 February

10 February

12 February

16 February

17 February

28 February

29 February

March

14 March

17 March

31 March

April

4 April

8 April

10 April

11 April

14 April

16 April

18 April

19 April

24 April

26 April

29 April

May

14 May

20 May

24 May

27 May

30 May

31 May

June

2 June

6 June

16 June

23 June

27 June

July

1 July

2 July

3 July

4 July

6 July

11 July

23 July

24 July

25 July

29 July

August

1 August

6 August

8 August

24 August

26 August

September

8 September

11 September

12 September

15 September

22 September

26 September

October

1 October

3 October

4 October

7 October

8 October

18 October

20 October

21 October

24 October

27 October

November

1 November

2 November

10 November

14 November

17 November

20 November

27 November

29 November

30 November

Unknown date

December

3 December

10 December

11 December

21 December

22 December

27 December

31 December

Unknown date

References 

1988
 
Ship